The Northern Luzon shrew-rat (Crunomys fallax) is a species of rodent in the family Muridae.
It is found only in the Philippines.
Its natural habitat is subtropical or tropical dry forest.
It is threatened by habitat loss.

References

Rats of Asia
Crunomys
Endemic fauna of the Philippines
Fauna of Luzon
Rodents of the Philippines
Mammals described in 1897
Taxa named by Oldfield Thomas
Taxonomy articles created by Polbot